Sternotomis is a genus of beetle belonging to the family Cerambycidae.

List of species

 Sternotomis albomaculata (Breuning, 1938)
 Sternotomis alternans Breuning, 1959
 Sternotomis amabilis (Hope, 1843)
 Sternotomis andrewesi Breuning, 1935
 Sternotomis bohemani Chevrolat, 1844
 Sternotomis burgeoni Breuning, 1935
 Sternotomis caillaudi Chevrolat, 1844
 Sternotomis callais Fairmaire, 1891
 Sternotomis carbonaria Aurivillius, 1904
 Sternotomis centralis Hintz, 1911
 Sternotomis chrysopras (Schönherr, 1817)
 Sternotomis ducalis (Klug, 1835)
 Sternotomis fairmairei Argod, 1899
 Sternotomis flavomaculata Hintz, 1919
 Sternotomis gama Coquerel, 1861
 Sternotomis itzingeri Breuning, 1935
 Sternotomis jeanneli Breuning, 1935
 Sternotomis kuntzeni Fiedler, 1939
 Sternotomis lemoulti Breuning, 1935
 Sternotomis lequeuxi Allard, 1993
 Sternotomis mathildae Allard, 1993
 Sternotomis mimica Breuning, 1935
 Sternotomis mirabilis (Drury, 1773)
 Sternotomis pulchra (Drury, 1773)
 Sternotomis rousseti Allard, 1993
 Sternotomis runsoriensis Gahan, 1909
 Sternotomis schoutedeni Breuning, 1935
 Sternotomis strandi Breuning, 1935
 Sternotomis variabilis Quedenfeldt, 1881
 Sternotomis virescens (Westwood, 1845)

References
 Biolib
 F. VITALI - Cerambycoidea

Sternotomini